Kattappana is a municipal town in the Sahyadri (or Western Ghats) of Kerala state, India. It is the second city to become a municipality in Idukki  District. It is a major commercial town and flourished with the boost in production of agriculture and spices.

Municipal administration 

 
Previously, Kattappana was included in the Udumbanchola tehsil (taluk) of Idukki district and was later included in the newly formed Idukki tehsil (taluk). It was officially declared as municipality by the state government on 1 November 2015. It became the second municipality in the district, while Thodupuzha became the first. The first municipal chairman was Mr. Johny Kulampallil and the current municipal chairperson is Ms Shyni Sunny Cherian.

It is one of the more important commercial centre in the high ranges and was on a fast track in terms of development and infrastructure building. However, it was the development of the Kottayam–Kattappana road and the Puliyanmala–Thodupuzha State highway that turned the town into a commercial centre. It was the agriculture sector that played a pivotal role in economically uplifting the town.

The Union Minister for Urban Development, Housing & Urban Poverty Alleviation and Information & Broadcasting, Shri M. Venkaiah Naidu presented the Swachhata Certificate to then Chairman of Kattappana Municipality Shri Johny Kulampally on becoming the Open Defecation Free Municipality in Kerala, in Kochi on October 18, 2016.

For administrative convenience, the municipality is divided into 34 wards.

Demographics 
As of 2011 Census, Kattappana had a population of 42,646, with 21,159 males and 21,487 females. Kattappana had an average literacy of 95.25% higher than the state average of 94%.

People migrated to this place mainly during the 1950s from Central Travancore. The migrations were majorly from Palai, Chenganassery and Kanjirapally taluks of Kottayam district and Pathanamthitta.
Descendants of earlier inhabitants, the tribals of the forest, can still be seen. The Mannan tribe is now concentrated around Kovilmala, near Kanchiyar.

Agriculture

Kattappana is the center for spices trade and the primary producer of cardamom and black pepper. The main occupation of people of Kattappana is agriculture. A specific type Njallani high yielding variety of cardamom, was developed in Kattappana. It is also the centre of production and marketing of coffee, cocoa and ginger. There are also several reputed tea plantations (Tata Tea, A V Thomas & Co, Malayalam Plantations, Kannan Devan etc.) in adjoining areas of the district.

Spices Board (erstwhile Cardamom Board under Government of India) has an office in Kattappana. A Spices Park is established at Puttadi near Kattappana.  Cardamom Research Institute is situated at Pampadumpara.

Njallani high yielding variety of cardamom was developed by Sebastian Joseph Njallani from Kattappana.

Climate
The climate of Kattappana falls under the Köppen climate classification. The place normally experiences a moderate climate. The humidity rises from the month of March to April and mid May. The average annual temperature here is 23 °C. The months of June, July, August and October receives significant amount of rainfall. November and December are the coldest months in the year.

Notable people
Shaji Chen - Tamil, Malayalam writer and Tamil film actor

Healthcare
St. John's Hospital, managed by the Hospitaller Brothers of St. John of God, is a leading health institution in Kattappana.An institution named St. John College of Nursing is attached to the hospital

Transportation

Kattappana has a well established road system to other districts as well as to nearby state Tamil Nadu. Recently one new National highway 185 announced to Idukki district, through Adimali-Cheruthoni-Kattappana-Kumily.

Distances to Nearby Towns

Nedumkandam -   - 18 km,
Kumily -   - 26.8 km,
Kottayam -   - 100.2 km,
Cumbum -  - 31.2 km,
Palai -   - 73.8 km,
Thodupuzha -   - 85.8 km,
Changanasherry -   - 112 km,
Theni -   - 68.8 km,

Major Roads Connecting Kattappana

References

External links

 Tourist Map of Idukki District
 Idukki District Administration

Cities and towns in Idukki district